The 1972 Pioneer Bowl was a college football bowl game in Texas, played between the Drake Bulldogs and  at Memorial Stadium in Wichita Falls. The second edition of the Pioneer Bowl, it was one of four regional finals in the College Division played on December 9. The division became Division II (and III) the following season.

Tennessee State jumped out early and built a 22–0 halftime lead; each team scored a second half touchdown and the final score was 29–7. It was the Tigers' fourth consecutive bowl win.

References

Pioneer Bowl
Drake Bulldogs football bowl games
Tennessee State Tigers football bowl games
Pioneer Bowl
Pioneer Bowl